Agrostistachys borneensis is a species of plant in the family Euphorbiaceae. It is a widespread plant native to much of Southeast Asia as well as India, Sri Lanka, and New Guinea.

Culture
Known as බෙරු (beru) in Sinhala.

References

External links

 http://iucnredlist.org/details/32582/0
 http://www.theplantlist.org/tpl/record/kew-4807
 http://www.theplantlist.org/tpl/record/kew-4805
 https://www.gbif.org/species/3063606
 http://www.biotik.org/india/species/a/agroborn/agroborn_en.html

Agrostistachydeae
Flora of tropical Asia
Plants described in 1904
Taxa named by Odoardo Beccari
Taxonomy articles created by Polbot